The 1979–80 Romanian Hockey League season was the 50th season of the Romanian Hockey League. Six teams participated in the league, and Steaua Bucuresti won the championship.

Regular season

External links
hochei.net

Romania
Romanian Hockey League seasons
Rom